Joshua Abuaku (born 7 July 1996) is a German 400 metres hurdler .

Career
He won a silver medal at the 2015 European Junior Championships in Eskilstuna, Sweden. He was selected to compete in the 400 metres hurdles at the 2020 Summer Olympics. He ran a season best time of 49.50 to reach the semi finals.

Personal life
Born in Germany, Abuaku is of Ghanaian descent.

References

1996 births
Living people
German male hurdlers
German sportspeople of Ghanaian descent
Athletes (track and field) at the 2020 Summer Olympics
Olympic athletes of Germany
Sportspeople from Oberhausen